Zihni Gjinali (5 May 1926 – 19 July 2005) was an Albanian footballer who played his professional career for Besa, Dinamo Tirana and Partizani Tirana football clubs. He was the captain and head coach of the Dinamo Dynasty of the 1950s. Gjinali was also a successful player with the Albania National Football Team.

International career
He made his debut for Albania in a May 1948 Balkan Cup match against Hungary and earned a total of 12 caps, scoring 3 goals. His final international was a December 1952 friendly match against Czechoslovakia.

Managerial career
During his spell at Dinamo, Gjinali acted as player coach. He later worked at Apolonia and Besa and was coach of Traktori Lushnja for several years.

References

1926 births
2005 deaths
Footballers from Kavajë
Albanian footballers
Association football forwards
Albania international footballers
Besa Kavajë players
FK Partizani Tirana players
FK Dinamo Tirana players
Albanian football managers
FK Dinamo Tirana managers
Besa Kavajë managers
KS Lushnja managers
KF Apolonia Fier managers
Kategoria Superiore players
Kategoria Superiore managers